Duệ Tông is the temple name used for several monarchs of Vietnam. It may refer to:

Trần Duệ Tông (1337–1377)
Nguyễn Phúc Thuần (1754–1777), one of the Nguyễn lords

See also
Ruizong (disambiguation) (Chinese equivalent)
Yejong (disambiguation) (Korean equivalent)

Temple name disambiguation pages